The Bourguiba mausoleum is a monumental grave in Monastir, Tunisia, containing the remains of former president Habib Bourguiba, the father of Tunisian independence, who died on April 6, 2000.

Description 

The mausoleum was built while Bourguiba was still alive, in 1963, in the modern Arab-Muslim style. The building is flanked by two  minarets and topped by a golden dome between two green domes. The mausoleum entrance gate and the gate that separates it from the rest of the cemetery are examples of Tunisian art.

In addition to the former president and his first wife, Mathilde, the mausoleum houses the bodies of his parents, his siblings, and other members of his family in two other halls. It was expanded in 1978.

Inside the mausoleum, there is a small museum housing some of president Bourguiba's personal belongings: his desk from the presidential palace of Carthage, his pens, passports and identity card, his glasses, and also his photos and his clothes (both Western and traditional: jebba, chéchia, and fez).

Gallery

See also
 Anıtkabir
 Gamal Abdel Nasser Mosque
 Mazar-e-Quaid
 Mausoleum of Mohammed V
 Mwalimu Nyerere Museum Centre
 Napoleon's tomb
 Türkmenbaşy Ruhy Mosque

References 

Mausoleums in Tunisia
Habib Bourguiba